Little Econlockhatchee River (or Little Econ River) is a major tributary of the Econlockhatchee River. It is located within the Middle St. Johns River Basin of the St. Johns River Water Management District. It is similar to the Econlockhatchee, with a forest in its floodplain. As far downstream as Blanchard Park, the river acts like a canal. In August 2008, the river rose a record  over its banks due to Tropical Storm Fay.

In November 2008, the river became a place of investigation after divers found a bag of toys, originally thought to be bones, in the river near Blanchard Park in East Orange County. The findings were thought to be related to the disappearance of Orlando toddler Caylee Anthony, who went missing in June 2008.

See also
Econlockhatchee River
List of Florida rivers

References

Rivers of Florida
Econlockhatchee River
Rivers of Orange County, Florida
Rivers of Seminole County, Florida